An executive home is a type of house that is intended to provide its occupant with higher-than-average levels of comfort, quality and convenience. It is a property which a person or family can afford to purchase later on, often using a combination of savings and mortgage financing. In the real estate industry the term commonly denotes large four to six bedroom houses, often older homes but sometimes high-cost new developments.

Definition
An executive home is a marketing euphemism for a moderately large and well-appointed house.

Executive homes are usually constructed among homes of very similar size and type by a subdivider on speculation; they are generally built en-masse by development companies to be marketed as premium real estate. Executive homes can differ from traditional mansions mostly in their parcel size, since many of these newer homes are built on increasingly small lots so developers can maximize available acreage.

Executive homes are generally found in outlying suburban areas because lot sizes in older neighborhoods generally are not conducive to new residences of this large scale.

History
Executive houses were formerly described as mansionettes or bijou residences. The word mansion historically denotes homes with more character than an average executive home. Executive homes have much in common with mansions in a traditional sense including large amounts of interior and exterior space.

Design

United Kingdom

In the United Kingdom, executive homes would comprise over 2,000 sq ft (198 sq m) of space and would be spread over two to four floors, would include underfloor heating on the ground floor, separate porches, large living rooms with fireplaces, separate dining rooms, large kitchen/diners or kitchens with breakfast rooms attached and both with granite or quartz worktops, utility rooms, downstairs studies, at least four double bedrooms with at least one en-suite, marble bathrooms and double or triple garages with driveways to park at least two cars.

United States of America
In the United States, executive homes have similar features including a two - four story plan, can have four or more bedrooms with three or more bathrooms, and powder rooms, main floor family rooms ancillary rooms such as loggias, breezeways, porte cocheres, foyers, atriums, libraries, game rooms, home theaters, pool houses, guest houses, wine cellars, gourmet kitchens and other single-use rooms.

Some of these types of houses include a mix of Rapunzel towers, marble columns, fanciful mixes of garish architectural features, many in a gated community with high security walls to keep out prying eyes, and elaborate entry gates with security details. Executive homes frequently have two or more fireplaces, multi-car garages, and sometimes full finished or unfinished basements. Designed to appeal to buyers at the top end of the property market, the large executive properties are in the highest percentage of size for residences in an area (usually over 4000 sq ft\398 sq m) and are situated on large lots, golf courses or sometimes gentleman's ranches of many acres.

Criticism
There have been many instances of developers buying large lots or multiple lots in historic neighborhoods, demolishing the older homes and building executive homes. This may have the effect of destroying the setting of older neighborhoods, and adversely impacting the integrity of historic districts. These lots are in desirable neighborhoods, and desirable school districts, and are close to urban centers, so the trend will likely continue. However, some communities such as Wellesley, Massachusetts and Austin, Texas have created policies and ordinances to retain older neighborhoods against these development pressures.

See also
 McMansion
 Luxury apartment
 Penthouse apartment

References

Further reading 
 On architecture: collected reflections on a century of change, By Ada Louise Huxtable, Bloomsbury Publishing USA, 2008
 A Field Guide to Sprawl, Dolores Hayden, W.W. Norton & Company, Published 2004, Page 110-111, Tract Mansion definition.
 Worry Over Wildlife as Homes Planned at West Moor, The Journal Newspaper, Newcastle, UK, Jan 21, 2011
 Ramside Hall expansion will lead to ‘Belfry of North’, The Advertiser Newspaper, Tallentire, Mark, January 21, 2011
 Extravagant Executive Homes, The David Neeleman Connecticut Mansion is Worth About $11 Million, Trendhunter Luxury website 
 Taking Stock of House Law, Review blocked 7 oversized projects, Noonan, Erica, February 5, 2009, The Boston Globe 
 Successes, Struggles in Cities' Efforts to Scare Off Monster Houses, Ross, Jenna, February 12, 2008, Minneapolis Star Tribune Newspaper
 City of Austin Development Regulations

Housing
House types
Residential real estate
Real estate terminology